On June 19, 1813 100 British soldiers landed outside Sodus (village), New York. 40 Militia put up some resistance but were forced to retreat. Because of the resistance the entire village was looted and burnt.

Background
After the Second Battle of Sacket's Harbor on May 29 Isaac Chauncey recalled the American fleet on Lake Ontario back to harbour as a defence against future British attacks. That gave the British ships on the lake room to operate on the New York coastline. On June 13 the British raided the nearby Charlotte. With the British landing at Charlotte, the Americans were certain a landing would soon occur at Sodus. A large force of Militia stayed there until the morning of the 19th when no attack came. In the morning the majority of the militia left. When 5 British ships appeared off the coast riders raced to call back the militia back but failed.

Action
On the night of June 19, 100 British soldiers landed undetected near the village of Sodus New York. Captain E. Hull and his 40 New York militia hid behind a treeline watching the village's approach. From the tree line, the Americans opened fire on the British who opened fire in return. After a short firefight leaving 3 British killed and 7 wounded and 1 American killed, 3 wounded, and 2 captured the Americans retreated. The British retreated back to their ships as well.

Aftermath
With the Americans gone, the next day the British landed once again unopposed. They entered the village and looted 230 barrels of flour and a few of pork and whiskey. All public property was looted and the entire village burnt. No resistance was put up by the New York militia at Charlotte and so the town didn't receive the same punishment as Sodus.

References

Sources

Battles of the War of 1812 in New York (state)
Wayne County, New York
June 1813 events
1813 in New York (state)
Military raids